The Flintstone Comedy Hour is an American animated television series and a spin-off of The Flintstones and The Pebbles and Bamm-Bamm Show, produced by Hanna-Barbera, which aired on CBS from September 9, 1972, to September 1, 1973. It was re-titled The Flintstone Comedy Show for a second season of reruns as a half-hour show from September 8, 1973, to January 26, 1974.

Overview
The show's first half-hour featured two shorts with Fred and Barney, one short with the cast of The Pebbles and Bamm-Bamm Show, short jokes, horoscopes, and two songs performed by the new Pebbles and Bamm-Bamm band called The Bedrock Rockers; the second half-hour featured four new episodes and reruns of The Pebbles and Bamm-Bamm Show. The show also featured Moonrock, Penny, Wiggy, "Bad-luck" Schleprock, Cindy and Fabian, and the Bronto Bunch (Bronto, Noodles, Stub and Zonk) from The Pebbles and Bamm-Bamm Show.

Mikki Stevens replaced Sally Struthers as the voice of Pebbles in four new episodes of The Pebbles and Bamm-Bamm Show and in brief in-between segments, Struthers at the time being fully committed to her role as Gloria Stivic on the sitcom All in the Family. This was the final spin-off to feature Alan Reed as the voice of Fred Flintstone before Reed's death in 1977.

For the 1973–74 television season, CBS dropped The Pebbles and Bamm-Bamm Show episodes and repackaged the first half-hour segments of The Flintstone Comedy Hour for a second season of reruns under the new title The Flintstone Comedy Show from September 8, 1973, to January 26, 1974. The "Fred & Barney" shorts and "The Bedrock Rockers" segments were later featured on the syndicated weekday series Fred Flintstone and Friends in 1977–78. The program continued to air in rebroadcasts under The Flintstone Comedy Show title on USA Cartoon Express, Cartoon Network and Boomerang.

Like many animated series created by Hanna-Barbera in the 1970s, the show contained a laugh track created by the studio.

The Bedrock Rockers
The Bedrock Rockers were Pebbles Flintstone (keyboard), Bamm-Bamm Rubble (bass), Moonrock Crater (drums), Penny Pillar (tambourine) and Wiggy Rockstone (flute). They performed two songs per episode which included:

 "Sunshine Man"
 "Summertime Girl"
 "Oh, How I Love You"
 "Keep in Time"
 "It Should Always Be Saturday"
 "Hop, Skip and a Jump"
 "Flying So High"
 "Yabba Dabba Doozie"
 "Shadow, Shadow"
 "Being With You"
 "Singing Song"
 "Song of the Season"
 "What's Your Sign?"
 "Sunny Sun Day"
 "Rock N Roll Circus"

The music was written by various Screen Gems staffers which, at the time, included David Gates (of Bread) penning the popular "Summertime Girl" and Tony Dancy (of Tony's Tygers) writing "Being With You" with Craig Fairchild & Jackie Mills. Mills also wrote "Sunshine Man" with Leonard Pettit and "Yabba Dabba Doozie" with Tom Jenkins. The actual group on the recordings were known as The Ron Hicklin Singers, featuring Tom Bahler on lead (he later penned the classic Michael Jackson song "She's Out of My Life"), John Bahler, Jackie Ward and Stan Farber. This lineup recorded on hundreds of commercials, TV themes and The Partridge Family recordings. Bahler's lead vocals are also prominent in The Love Generation, who issued a few LPs in the late 1960s.

Episodes
Each episode contained two shorts featuring the traditional antics and adventures of Fred and Barney and one short featuring Pebbles and Bamm-Bamm with their friends Moonrock, Penny, Wiggy, Schleprock, Cindy and Fabian, and the Bronto Bunch (Bronto, Noodles, Stub and Zonk).

Voice cast
 Alan Reed as Fred Flintstone
 Mel Blanc as Barney Rubble, Dino, Zonk, Stub
 Carl Esser as Fabian Fabquartz
 Gay Hartwig as Betty Rubble, Wiggy Rockstone, Cindy Curbstone
 Don Messick as Schleprock
 Mitzi McCall as Penny Pillar
 Jay North as Bamm-Bamm Rubble
 John Stephenson as Mr. Slate, Noodles
 Mickey Stevens as Pebbles Flintstone
 Jean Vander Pyl as Wilma Flintstone
 Lennie Weinrib as Moonrock Crater, Bronto

Production credits
 Produced and Directed by: William Hanna and Joseph Barbera
 Associate Producer: Alex Lovy
 Story: Dick Robbins, Tom Dagenais, Jack Hanrahan, Len Janson, Bob Ogle, Sheldon Mann, Jack Mendelsohn, Charles Menville, Howard Morganstern
 Story Direction: Jim Carmichael, Carl Fallberg, George Jorgensen, Jim Mueller, Steve Clark, Jan Green, Earl Klein, Bill Perez, Paul Sommer
 Voices: Alan Reed, Mel Blanc, Tom Bahler, Carl Esser, Gay Hartwig, Ron Hicklin, Mitzi McCall, Don Messick, Jay North, John Stephenson, Mickey Stevens, Sally Stevens, Jean VanderPyl, Jackie Ward, Len Weinrib
 Animation Director: Charles A. Nichols
 Production Design: Iwao Takamoto
 Production Supervisor: Victor O. Schipek
 Assistant Animation Director: Carl Urbano
 Layout: Dick Bickenbach, Ed Benedict, Jaime Diaz, Jack Huber, Don Jurwich, Andrea Brown, David Hanan, Willie Ito, Don Sheppard
 Animation: Jerry Hathcock, George Cannata, Hugh Fraser, Dick Lundy, Joan Orbison, Ray Patterson, David Tendlar, Lillian Evans, George Kreisl, Margaret Nichols, Don Patterson, Jay Sarbry, Carlo Vinci, Xenia
 Backgrounds: Fernando Montealegre, Martin Forte, Tom Knowles, Eric Semones, Gino Guidice, Bob Schaefer, Jeannette Toews, Peter Van Elk
 Titles: Iraj Paran
 Musical Director: Hoyt Curtin
 Music Coordinator: Paul DeKorte
 Music Composed and Conducted by: Dean Elliott
 Technical Supervisor: Frank Paiker
 Ink and Paint Supervisor: Jayne Barbera
 Xerography: Robert "Tiger" West
 Sound Direction: Richard Olson, Bill Getty
 Supervising Film Editor: Larry Cowan
 Film Editors: Rich Allen, James Yaras
 Negative Consultant: William E. DeBoer
 Post Production: Joed Eaton
 Camera: Dick Blundell, Tom Barnes, Ralph Migliori, Roy Wade, George Epperson
 A Hanna-Barbera Production
 RCA Sound Recording
 This picture has made the jurisdiction of I.A.T.S.E., affiliated with A.F.L.-C.L.O.
 Hanna-Barbera Productions, Inc. All rights reserved. ©MCMLXXII-MCMLXXVII.· All featured songs controlled by Screen Gems Columbia Music, Inc./Colgems Music Corp.

References

External links
 
 The Flintstone Comedy Hour at The Big Cartoon DataBase

The Flintstones spin-offs
1972 American television series debuts
1974 American television series endings
1970s American animated television series
American animated television spin-offs
American children's animated comedy television series
American children's animated musical television series
CBS original programming
English-language television shows
Television series by Hanna-Barbera
Television series by Screen Gems
Television series by Sony Pictures Television
Television series by Warner Bros. Television Studios
Television series set in prehistory